Julie Smolyansky (born 1975) is a Ukrainian-American businesswoman. She is the CEO of Illinois-based dairy company Lifeway Foods.

Life and career 
Smolyansky was born in Kyiv, Ukraine (then Ukrainian SSR), to Jewish parents Ludmila and Michael Smolyansky. Her family immigrated to the United States when she was one.
 
Smolyansky earned a B.A. in psychology from the University of Illinois at Chicago in 1996.

Her father founded the Kefir company Lifeway Foods in 1986. In 1997, Smolyansky joined the business. After he died of a heart attack in 2002, Julie, aged 27, became the youngest CEO of a publicly traded firm. She, along with her brother as CFO, transformed the company into a multinational firm, growing its revenue from $12 million to $130 million in 2015.

Smolyansky was featured on Fortune's 2014 40 under 40 list.

Philanthropy 
Smolyansky has served on the boards of the Anti-Defamation League, Hebrew Immigrant Aid Society, and the Illinois Holocaust Museum and Education Center.

Smolyansky has been active in the conversation about sexual violence. She has supported several documentaries covering the violence against girls in Muslim-majority countries. She is also the co-founder of Test400k which is a non-profit dedicated to eliminating the backlog of 400,000 untested rape kits in the U.S. and stop violence against women.

References

External links
Entrepreneur: Julie Smolyansky of Lifeway Foods, interview with Bill Moller

Living people
American drink industry businesspeople
American chief executives of food industry companies
Ukrainian SSR emigrants to the United States
American retail chief executives
American women chief executives
Businesspeople from Illinois
University of Illinois Chicago alumni
1975 births
21st-century American women